

Werner Otto Sanne (5 April 1889 – 26 September 1952) was a German general (Generalleutnant) in the Wehrmacht during World War II who commanded several divisions. He was a recipient of the Knight's Cross of the Iron Cross of Nazi Germany.

Career 
Sanne commanded the 34th Infantry Division from May to November 1940, having earlier been in charge of the 193rd Replacement Division, which served to control replacement units undergoing training. In December 1940, he was appointed commander of the 100th Light Infantry Division, which had just been formed in Vienna. His new command fought entirely on the Eastern Front, firstly in the Ukraine and later in 1942, as part of the 6th Army, at Stalingrad. Promoted to Generalleutnant (lieutenant general) in April 1942, shortly before the division was redesignated as the 100th Jäger Division, he surrendered to the Soviet troops in January 1943 at the conclusion of the Battle of Stalingrad. He died in captivity in 1952.

Awards and decorations
 Iron Cross (1939) 2nd Class & 1st Class
 German Cross in Gold (19 December 1941)
 Knight's Cross of the Iron Cross on 22 February 1942 as generalleutnant and commander of 100th Infantry Division

References

Notes

Bibliography 

 

 
 

1889 births
1952 deaths
Lieutenant generals of the German Army (Wehrmacht)
Military personnel from Berlin
German Army personnel of World War I
Prussian Army personnel
Recipients of the Gold German Cross
Recipients of the Knight's Cross of the Iron Cross
German prisoners of war in World War II held by the Soviet Union
German people who died in Soviet detention
German commanders at the Battle of Stalingrad
Reichswehr personnel
People from the Province of Brandenburg
Recipients of the clasp to the Iron Cross, 1st class
German Army generals of World War II